Marta Lo Deserto (born March 30, 2002) is an Italian curler from Cortina d'Ampezzo, Italy. She currently plays third on the Italian National Women's Curling Team skipped by Stefania Constantini.

Career
Lo Deserto made her international debut at the 2019 World Junior-B Curling Championships as alternate for the Stefania Constantini rink. The team finished 3–3 at the tournament, failing to qualifying for the 2019 World Junior Curling Championships. The next month, she skipped the Italian mixed team at the 2019 European Youth Olympic Winter Festival, finishing with a 3–3 record.

In 2020, her mixed team represented Italy at the 2020 Youth Olympics. After finishing 4–1 in the round robin, they lost to Norway in the quarterfinals. She then competed in the mixed doubles tournament with Spanish curler Aleix Raubert. They lost in the round of 24.

She joined the Italian National Women's Curling Team at third for the 2020–21 season. With teammates Stefania Constantini, Angela Romei, Giulia Zardini Lacedelli and Elena Dami, she competed in her first World Championship at the 2021 World Women's Curling Championship. The Italian team was originally not supposed to compete in the 2021 championship, but due to the cancellation of qualification events as well as the change in the Olympic Qualification Process, they were added as the fourteenth team. At the World Championships, the team finished in thirteenth place with a 2–11 record, their wins coming against Estonia and Germany.

At the 2021 European Curling Championships in Lillehammer, Norway, the Italian team posted a 4–5 round robin record. This placed them sixth in the group, which was good enough to earn Italy a spot in the 2022 World Women's Curling Championship. In the sixth round robin draw, the team defeated Scotland's Eve Muirhead 8–7, being the only team to defeat the Scottish side as they went on to win the gold medal in the playoff round. In December 2021, the team travelled to Leeuwarden, Netherlands to compete in the 2021 Olympic Qualification Event, hoping to secure Italy a spot in the women's event at the Beijing Olympics. After eight draws, the Italian team sat in fourth place in the standings with a 4–3 record. They faced Muirhead's British side in their final round robin draw, with the chance to secure the fourth playoff spot. The team, however, would lose 8–1 to Team Muirhead, meaning Latvia earned the last playoff spot instead of them. At the World Women's Championship, the team finished in tenth-place with a 4–8 record, defeating Czech Republic, Norway, Scotland and Turkey.

Personal life
Lo Deserto is currently a student.

Teams

References

External links

Living people
2002 births
Italian female curlers
People from Cortina d'Ampezzo
Sportspeople from the Province of Belluno
21st-century Italian women